Kentwood High Magnet School is a senior high school in Kentwood, Louisiana, United States. It is a part of the Tangipahoa Parish School Board.

History
In 1889, the first school building in Kentwood opened. In 1896 the Kentwood Collegiate Institution was established, and its first graduating class was in 1906. After Kentwood Collegiate opened it gained a two-story building adjacent to the original one. The Southern Association of Colleges and Schools accredited the school in 1923. A high school building opened in 1931 was destroyed by a fire in 1938, and replaced by the current high school building in 1940.

A gymnasium was opened in 1942, and a stadium was added in 1950. Kentwood High consolidated with W. Dillon High School in 1969, adding grades 1 though 3 and 9 through 12. In 1971, elementary grades were removed, leaving only grades 7 through 12. The current high school building was renovated in 1979 and the American football building was renovated in 1984. In 1995, a vocational building opened. In 2011, the school was renamed after becoming a magnet fine and performing arts school.

Athletics
Kentwood High athletics competes in the LHSAA.

Championships
Football championships
(9) State Championships: 1928, 1939, 1969, 1983, 1986, 1997, 1998, 2015, 2018

References

External links

Public high schools in Louisiana
Public middle schools in Louisiana
Schools in Tangipahoa Parish, Louisiana